Victor Mattos Cardozo (born December 19, 1989), simply known as Victor or Victor Cardozo, is a Brazilian footballer who currently plays for Chiangrai United in the Thai League 1. His goal during the Thai League Week 11 against Buriram United was considered one of the top 5 goals of the round in an article by FOX Sports Asia.

Honours

Ubon UMT United
 Regional League Division 2: 2015

Chiangrai United
 Thai FA Cup: 2018
 Thai League Cup: 2018
 Thailand Champions Cup: 2018

BG Pathum United
 Thai League 1: 2020–21
 Thailand Champions Cup: 2021

Individual
Thai League 1 Best XI: 2020–21

References

Brazilian footballers
Duque de Caxias Futebol Clube players
Esporte Clube São Bento players
1989 births
Living people
Clube Esportivo Bento Gonçalves players
America Football Club (RJ) players
Victor Cardozo
Victor Cardozo
Victor Cardozo
Expatriate footballers in Thailand
Brazilian expatriate sportspeople in Thailand
Association football central defenders